Motel Mozaïque is a cultural organisation, based in Rotterdam, Netherlands. Founded in 2001 by Harry Hamelink, Motel Mozaïque focuses on music, art, poetry, dance, guided tours and multi-disciplinary performances. 

Motel Mozaïque showcases new and upcoming movements in different art disciplines and each year organises several cultural events such as the international arts and music festival MOMO Festival, a festival in the M4H port area, MOMO Fabrique, and a series of concerts in different venues of Rotterdam.

Several locations cooperate during the festival's weekend, including WORM (Rotterdam), Rotown. The festival offers a free program in Schouwburgplein (Rotterdam). The next edition will take place April 13-15, 2023 and it will feature a performance by Big Thief.

Editions

Previous edition of MOMO Festival featured Sylvie Kreusch, Jockstrap (band), Eefje de Visser, Black Country, New Road, Apparat (musician), Panda Bear (band), Nilufer Yanya, Fontaines D.C., Black Midi, Tamino, Amenra, Thundercat, Shame (band), Warhaus, Amos Ben-Tal & Spinvis, Damien Jurado, Protomartyr, The Notwist, Kae Tempest, Villagers, The Staves, Will Butler, Asgeir, Jungle (band), George Ezra, Kurt Vile, Angel Olsen, Patrick Watson, Balthazar, Blaudzun, The Maccabees, Belle & Sebastian, James Blake, Lykke Li.

References

External links
 www.motelmozaique.nl

Music festivals in the Netherlands
Culture in Rotterdam
Tourist attractions in Rotterdam